Shawn Kenneth McEachern (born February 28, 1969) is an American ice hockey coach and former professional ice hockey player. He is the current head boys' varsity ice hockey coach at The Rivers School, an independent 6–12 school in Weston, Massachusetts.

Biography
As a youth, McEachern played in the 1981 and 1982 Quebec International Pee-Wee Hockey Tournaments with a minor ice hockey team from Boston.

During his stint as a professional, he tallied 254 goals and 317 assists during a 13-year NHL career with the Boston Bruins, Pittsburgh Penguins, Los Angeles Kings, Ottawa Senators and Atlanta Thrashers. He scored over 30 goals in two different seasons and his best point total came in 2000–01, when he notched 32 goals and 40 assists for the Ottawa Senators. He won a Stanley Cup championship in 1992 with the Pittsburgh Penguins. On August 27, 2006, he announced his retirement.

Before entering the NHL, McEachern was a standout ice hockey player at Boston University and at Matignon High School in Cambridge, Massachusetts, where he won two state championships.  He has previously served as an assistant hockey coach at University of Massachusetts Lowell, as well as Northeastern University and Salem State University. He is also the coach for the East Coast Wizards U16 team in Bedford, Massachusetts.

He currently resides in Marblehead, Massachusetts.

Awards and honors

Career statistics

Regular season and playoffs

International

See also
Captain (ice hockey)

References

External links

Shawn McEachern's TSN profile
Shawn McEachern's Hockey Reference profile

1969 births
American men's ice hockey left wingers
Atlanta Thrashers captains
Atlanta Thrashers players
Boston Bruins players
Boston University Terriers men's ice hockey players
Espoo Blues players
Ice hockey coaches from Massachusetts
Ice hockey players at the 1992 Winter Olympics
Living people
Los Angeles Kings players
Malmö Redhawks players
Olympic ice hockey players of the United States
Ottawa Senators players
Sportspeople from Waltham, Massachusetts
Pittsburgh Penguins draft picks
Pittsburgh Penguins players
Providence Bruins players
Stanley Cup champions
AHCA Division I men's ice hockey All-Americans
Ice hockey players from Massachusetts